Ichiba Station (市場駅) is the name of three train stations in Japan:

 Ichiba Station (Fukuoka)
 Ichiba Station (JR West)
 Ichiba Station (Shintetsu)

See also
 Tōkaichiba Station (disambiguation)
 Tsurumi-Ichiba Station